Sedykh or Sedyh is a gender-neutral Slavic surname. It may refer to
Anatoli Sedykh (born 1970), Russian association football player
Natalya Sedykh (born 1948), Russian figure skater, ballet dancer, and film actor
Yuriy Sedykh (born 1955), Soviet hammer thrower, father of Alexia